Busy work (also known as make-work and busywork) is an activity that is undertaken to pass time and stay busy but in and of itself has little or no actual value. Busy work occurs in business, military and other settings, in situations where people may be required to be present but may lack the opportunities, skills or need to do something more productive. People may engage in busy work to maintain an appearance of activity, in order to avoid criticism of being inactive or idle.

Educational settings
In the context of education, busy work allows students to work independently, to test their own knowledge and skills, and to practise using new skills learned in the educational setting. It can consist of various types of schoolwork assigned by a teacher to keep students occupied with activities involving learning and cognition while the teacher focuses upon another group of students. The functionality of busy work is associated with levels of interest students have with the content of the work, levels of enjoyment students have in performing the work, how purposeful the work is, and how accomplishment of the work is perceived by students. The perceived results of the work by students is significant: when students feel that they've succeeded in accomplishing a functional task, it's congruent with learning and the attainment of new skills.

Busy work can also be used to keep the students occupied with educational tasks during idle times, such as instances when time in school remains but the day's curriculum has already concluded. This application of busy work to consume idle time was common in primary education, but the need for work to have educational content, rather than existing just to consume time, is now preferred.

Busy work has historical precedent in primary education. Conditioning students to believe that busy work carries the same value as progressive work can lead to students maintaining this belief later in life, carrying it through to the workplace.

Business and work settings

In business and work settings, people may engage in busy work to maintain an appearance of activity to protect their employment status (to avoid termination or sanctions).

Workers believe that it is more important to maintain a constant appearance of working urgently so that they and others believe that what is being done is important. Constant urgency in workers can lead to disproportionate distribution of actual work, as workers may put off important work by attempting to complete previously designated less important tasks. Maintaining very high levels of constant busyness may actually be detrimental to the operations of a business or organization in which new tasks are not undertaken in a timely manner because workers are always very busy. That can also lead to workers taking shortcuts to accomplish tasks more quickly, which can negatively affect the quality of work results.

Busy work also can be counterproductive in work settings because it may not be aligned with the overall objectives and priorities of an organization's plans for attaining and maintaining success in its ventures. The assumption that activity in the workplace is more important than productivity in the workplace can lead to employees thinking that quantity of work is better than quality of work, which is not productive to the overall functioning of a business.

Military settings
Busy work is used in armed forces to keep servicemembers from becoming bored, inactive and idle. Tasks of this sort include drill, memorizing regulations, getting haircuts, spit and polishing footwear and other cleaning chores such as scrubbing the deck.

See also

 Bullshit Jobs: A Theory, a 2018 book by anthropologist David Graeber 
 Parkinson's law
 Boondoggle
 Displacement activity
 Handwaving
 Make-work job
 Pastime
 Penal labour
 Presenteeism
 Red tape
 Underemployment
 Vacuum activity
 Workhouse

References

Sources
 (1909) Education by doing: occupations and busy work for primary classes – Anna Johnson – Google Books
 (2010) Do More Great Work: Stop the Busywork, and Start the Work That Matters - Michael Bungay Stanier - Google Books
 USATODAY.com - Be sure 'busy work' isn't keeping you from growing your business
 (2012) Why Busy Work Doesn't Work - John Kotter

External links
 

School terminology
Standards-based education
Education reform
Business terms
Labor
Employment